Patty Seymour (born January 23, 1960) is an American semi-retired professional wrestler, better known by her ring name Leilani Kai. She began training with The Fabulous Moolah right after finishing high school. In the 1980s, as part of the World Wrestling Federation (WWF)'s Rock 'n' Wrestling Connection, a storyline that combined wrestling and music, Kai defeated Wendi Richter to become the Women's Champion. Kai, however, lost the title at the inaugural WrestleMania event. She was later paired with Judy Martin, in a tag team that would become known as The Glamour Girls. The team held the Women's Tag Team Championship twice (managed by "The Mouth of the South" Jimmy Hart) and the LPWA Tag Team Championship once. In her later career, Kai returned briefly to the WWF in 1994, challenging for the Women's Championship at WrestleMania X. She also wrestled for World Championship Wrestling under the name Patty Stonegrinder and held the NWA World Women's Championship.

Professional wrestling career

Early career (1975–1985) 
Seymour was trained by The Fabulous Moolah in 1975 right after she finished high school. She was originally from Florida, but because Moolah thought she looked a little bit Hawaiian, Seymour was given the ring name Leilani Kai. Her fellow wrestlers also bestowed upon her the nickname "The Hawaiian Princess" during her early career. Four weeks after beginning her training, Moolah sent her on a two-week tour of Alaska. Over the next few years she worked for promotions throughout the United States, including in Oklahoma, Minnesota, California, and New York. It was in 1979 in North Carolina, that Kai first began working with Judy Martin, who would be her future tag team partner.

World Wrestling Federation (1985–1989)

Women's Champion (1985) 

On July 23, 1984, Wendi Richter defeated The Fabulous Moolah at MTV's The Brawl to End it All for the WWF Women's Championship, ending what was billed as the longest championship reign in professional wrestling history (Moolah's 28-year reign, though in reality she had won and lost the title on numerous occasions and Richter actually ended a 7-year reign). As a result, in early 1985, Kai—who had been trained by Moolah—wrestled Richter and defeated her for the title at The War to Settle the Score, with Moolah in her corner and singer Cyndi Lauper in Richter's corner. Richter, however, regained the title at the first-ever WrestleMania one month later. These matches were part of the WWF's "Rock 'n' Wrestling Connection", an era that combined both music and professional wrestling.

The Glamour Girls (1985–1989) 

Kai was then paired with Judy Martin, and the duo won the WWF Women's Tag Team Championship from the champions Velvet McIntyre and Desiree Petersen in Egypt in August 1985, although this match's existence has been disputed. Meanwhile, in August 1986, Kai traveled to Japan where she won All Japan Women's Pro-Wrestling's All Pacific Championship from Chigusa Nagayo, whom she also lost the title to in April 1987.

In November 1987, Kai and Martin became known as The Glamour Girls, and she underwent an image change that involved bleaching her dark hair platinum blonde at the suggestion of their manager Jimmy Hart. The duo appeared at the first Survivor Series in 1987 as part of then champion Sherri Martel's team to face the Fabulous Moolah's team. Martel's team—Martel, the Glamour Girls, Dawn Marie, and Donna Christanello—lost to The Fabulous Moolah's team—Moolah, Velvet McIntyre, Rockin' Robin, and the Jumping Bomb Angels (Noriyo Tateno and Itsuki Yamazaki). Kai and Martin feuded in 1988 with Japanese imports the Jumping Bomb Angels for the Women's Tag Team Championship. The two teams staged a two out of three falls match at the first Royal Rumble event in 1988, with the Jumping Bomb Angels capturing the gold. Kai and Martin recaptured the title months later in June 1988 before the belts were once again abandoned in 1989 when the company lost interest in the women's division.

Ladies Professional Wrestling Association (1990–1991) 
The Glamour Girls then surfaced in the newly formed Ladies Professional Wrestling Association (LPWA), managed by Adnan El Kassey. In February 1991, they won the LPWA Tag Team Championship from the team of Misty Blue and Heidi Lee Morgan. Leilani Kai appeared on the November 10, 1991 episode of WCW Main Event, losing to Madusa. They retained the Tag Team Championship against Malia Hosaka and Bambi at the only LPWA pay per view Superladies Showdown in 1992. The title was abandoned when the promotion closed.

Late career (1991–present) 
Kai returned to the WWF on March 20, 1994, at WrestleMania X to unsuccessfully challenge Alundra Blayze in a Women's Championship match. On October 20, 1996, she wrestled Madusa in a losing effort during WCW WorldWide. In the later 1990s, Kai returned to World Championship Wrestling under the name Patty Stonegrinder, usually wrestling against Madusa.

Kai traded the NWA Mid-Atlantic Women's Championship with Strawberry Fields in 2000, holding the belt a total of three times. In the summer of 2002, Kai challenged Lexie Fyfe for the Professional Girl Wrestling Association's (PGWA) championship in Branson, Missouri and won the belt. In 2002, however, Pippa L'Vinn defeated her for the title.

On March 12, 2003, she defeated Madison to win the NWA World Women's Championship in a dark match on a Total Nonstop Action Wrestling pay-per-view. She defended the belt at the NWA 55th Anniversary Show against AJ Sparx in October 2003. She was later stripped of the title by NWA President Bill Behrens on June 19, 2004, after Kai no-showed several events.

After becoming less active in the ring, she also began training female wrestlers, including Amber O'Neal. She also served as a trainer for the California-based Women of Wrestling.

On September 5, 2013, it was announced that Kai will debut at Pro Wrestling Syndicate Bombshells against Sumie Sakai on September 28 in Iselin, NJ.

On May 31, 2014, Kai appeared on West Coast Wrestling Connection, slapping Kylie Sutton for allegedly implying that she was old. The following week, Kai was scheduled to face Sutton in a match. After refusing to participate, she forced her manager Jonny Fairplay to take her place. Sutton won the match by DQ after Kai entered the ring and attacked her, before referees pulled her off.

Personal life 
In addition to wrestling, Seymour has trained with nunchucks for at least two years. She also rides motorcycles, deep sea fishes, and hunts wild boar. Seymour previously owned an apartment in Hawaii.

Championships and accomplishments 
 All Japan Women's Pro-Wrestling
 All Pacific Championship (1 time)
 Ladies Professional Wrestling Association
 LPWA Tag Team Championship (1 time) – with Judy Martin
 National Wrestling Alliance
 NWA World Women's Championship (1 time)
 NWA World Women's Tag Team Championship (2 times) – with Judy Martin
 NWA Hall of Fame (Class of 2006)
 NWA Mid-Atlantic
 NWA Mid-Atlantic Women's Championship (3 times)
 New Dimension Wrestling
 NDW Women's Championship (1 time)
 Professional Girl Wrestling Association
 PGWA Championship (1 time)
 Penny Banner Spirit of Excellence Award (2001)
 Professional Wrestling Hall of Fame
 Class of 2016
 Ultimate Championship Wrestling
 UCW Women's Championship (1 time)
 World Wrestling Federation
 WWF Women's Championship (1 time)
 WWF Women's Tag Team Championship (2 times) – with Judy Martin

Notes

References

External links 
 
 

1960 births

20th-century professional wrestlers
21st-century American women
21st-century professional wrestlers
American female professional wrestlers
Living people
Professional wrestlers from Florida
Professional Wrestling Hall of Fame and Museum
Professional wrestling trainers
NWA World Women's Champions
WWF/WWE Women's Champions